Manuel Almeida Duarte (29 May 1945 – 2 September 2022) was a Portuguese footballer who played as a striker.

Club career
Duarte was born in Celorico de Basto, Braga District. In a 16–year professional career he played for Académica de Coimbra, Leixões SC, Sporting CP, FC Porto, Varzim S.C. and AD Fafe, amassing Primeira Liga totals of 79 matches and 32 goals over nine seasons and competing in the second division with the last two clubs. He retired at the age of 39, after five years in amateur football with four sides.

Duarte scored a career-best 11 goals (in only 19 games) in the 1966–67 campaign, helping Sporting to the fourth position.

International career
Duarte earned two caps for Portugal in 1966, being an unused squad member at that year's FIFA World Cup.

Death
Duarte died in Fafe on 2 September 2022, at the age of 77.

References

External links

1945 births
2022 deaths
People from Celorico de Basto
Sportspeople from Braga District
Portuguese footballers
Association football forwards
Primeira Liga players
Liga Portugal 2 players
Associação Académica de Coimbra – O.A.F. players
Leixões S.C. players
Sporting CP footballers
FC Porto players
Varzim S.C. players
AD Fafe players
F.C. Felgueiras players
Portugal international footballers
1966 FIFA World Cup players